Fred Knoth (September 12, 1907 – November 1990) was a special effects artist who was the longtime special effects head of Universal Studios.  He won a 1955 Academy Award for Technical Achievement with Orien Ernest for "the development of a hand portable, electric, dry oil-fog machine".

Knoth was a graduate of the University of Colorado where he was a member of Phi Kappa Tau fraternity.

External links
 

1907 births
1976 deaths
University of Colorado alumni
Special effects people
Academy Award for Technical Achievement winners